Neptune Township is a township in Monmouth County, in the U.S. state of New Jersey. As of the 2020 United States census, the township's population was 28,061, an increase of 126 (+0.5%) from the 2010 census count of 27,935, which in turn reflected an increase of 245 (+0.9%) from the 27,690 counted in the 2000 census.

Neptune was incorporated as a township by an act of the New Jersey Legislature on February 26, 1879, from portions of Ocean Township. Portions of the township were taken to form Neptune City (October 4, 1881), Bradley Beach (March 13, 1893) and Ocean Grove (April 5, 1920, until the action was found unconstitutional and restored to Neptune Township as of June 16, 1921). The township was named for Neptune, the Roman water deity, and its location on the Atlantic Ocean.

Geography
According to the U.S. Census Bureau, the township had a total area of 8.84 square miles (22.90 km2), including 8.13 square miles (21.05 km2) of land and 0.72 square miles (1.86 km2) of water (8.11%).

Ocean Grove (2010 Census population of 3,342) and Shark River Hills (2010 population of 3,697) are census-designated places and unincorporated communities located within Neptune Township. Other unincorporated communities, localities and place names located partially or completely within the township include Bradley Park, the Gables, Green Grove, Hamilton, Hamilton Mills, Mid-Town, Summerfield, Seaview Island, The Observatory, West Grove, West Neptune, and Whitesville.

Neptune Township stretches from the Atlantic Ocean west to the Garden State Parkway (exit 100). The southern border is the Shark River estuary, and the northern border is with Asbury Park and Ocean Township. Neptune Township is a diverse community, both in terms of population and landscape, extending from the seaside community of Ocean Grove, a national historic site, to Mid-town which is undergoing a municipal-led revitalization, to the riverside residential community of Shark River Hills, to the open spaces of Shark River Park and the commercial corridor on Route 66 in the west.

The township borders the Monmouth County communities of Asbury Park, Avon-by-the-Sea, Belmar, Bradley Beach, Neptune City, Ocean Township, Tinton Falls, and Wall Township.

Demographics

Census 2010

The Census Bureau's 2006–2010 American Community Survey showed that (in 2010 inflation-adjusted dollars) median household income was $58,630 (with a margin of error of +/− $3,034) and the median family income was $74,422 (+/− $5,369). Males had a median income of $56,743 (+/− $4,233) versus $43,853 (+/− $3,118) for females. The per capita income for the borough was $30,656 (+/− $1,559). About 8.1% of families and 10.0% of the population were below the poverty line, including 13.7% of those under age 18 and 6.7% of those age 65 or over.

Census 2000
As of the 2000 United States census there were 27,690 people, 10,907 households, and 6,805 families residing in the township.  The population density was 3,366.8 people per square mile (1,300.6/km2).  There were 12,217 housing units at an average density of 1,485.4 per square mile (573.8/km2).  The racial makeup of the township was 55.92% White, 38.16% African American, 0.17% Native American, 1.17% Asian, 0.04% Pacific Islander, 1.98% from other races, and 2.56% from two or more races. Hispanic or Latino of any race were 5.55% of the population.

There were 10,907 households, out of which 26.3% had children under the age of 18 living with them, 42.6% were married couples living together, 15.8% had a female householder with no husband present, and 37.6% were non-families. 31.5% of all households were made up of individuals, and 11.8% had someone living alone who was 65 years of age or older.  The average household size was 2.46 and the average family size was 3.14.

In the township the population was spread out, with 23.1% under the age of 18, 6.7% from 18 to 24, 29.7% from 25 to 44, 23.8% from 45 to 64, and 16.8% who were 65 years of age or older. The median age was 39 years. For every 100 females, there were 87.1 males.  For every 100 females age 18 and over, there were 82.0 males.

The median income for a household in the township was $46,250, and the median income for a family was $57,735. Males had a median income of $42,920 versus $31,057 for females. The per capita income for the township was $22,569.  About 7.6% of families and 11.7% of the population were below the poverty line, including 17.2% of those under age 18 and 9.7% of those age 65 or over.

Government

Local government 
Neptune Township is governed under the Township form of New Jersey municipal government, one of 141 municipalities (of the 564) statewide that use this form, the second-most commonly used form of government in the state. The Township Committee is comprised of five members, who are elected directly by the voters at-large in partisan elections to serve three-year terms of office on a staggered basis, with either one or two seats coming up for election each year as part of the November general election in a three-year cycle. At an annual reorganization meeting the Township Committee selects one of its members to serve as Mayor and another as Deputy Mayor.

, members of the Neptune Township Committee are Mayor Nicholas R. Williams (D, term on committee ends on December 31, 2024; term as mayor ends 2022), Keith Cafferty (D, term on committee ends 2023; term as deputy mayor ends 2022), Dr. Michael Brantley (D, 2024), Robert Lane Jr. (D, 2022) and Tassie D. York (D, 2022; elected to serve an unexpired term).

In April 2021, the Township Committee selected Tassie York to fill the seat expiring in December 2022 that had been held by Carol J. Rizzo until she resigned from office to move out of the county. York served on an interim basis until the November 2022 general election, when she was elected to serve the balance of the term of office.

In January 2016, the Township Council selected Carol J. Rizzo from three candidates nominated by the Democratic municipal committee to fill the seat expiring in December 2016 which was vacated by Eric Houghtaling when he took office in the New Jersey General Assembly earlier that month.

Federal, state, and county representation 
Neptune Township is located in the 6th Congressional District and is part of New Jersey's 11th state legislative district.

 

Monmouth County is governed by a Board of County Commissioners comprised of five members who are elected at-large to serve three year terms of office on a staggered basis, with either one or two seats up for election each year as part of the November general election. At an annual reorganization meeting held in the beginning of January, the board selects one of its members to serve as Director and another as Deputy Director. , Monmouth County's Commissioners are
Commissioner Director Thomas A. Arnone (R, Neptune City, term as commissioner and as director ends December 31, 2022), 
Commissioner Deputy Director Susan M. Kiley (R, Hazlet Township, term as commissioner ends December 31, 2024; term as deputy commissioner director ends 2022),
Lillian G. Burry (R, Colts Neck Township, 2023),
Nick DiRocco (R, Wall Township, 2022), and 
Ross F. Licitra (R, Marlboro Township, 2023). 
Constitutional officers elected on a countywide basis are
County clerk Christine Giordano Hanlon (R, 2025; Ocean Township), 
Sheriff Shaun Golden (R, 2022; Howell Township) and 
Surrogate Rosemarie D. Peters (R, 2026; Middletown Township).

Politics
As of March 2011, there were a total of 18,093 registered voters in Neptune Township, of which 6,481 (35.8%) were registered as Democrats, 2,780 (15.4%) were registered as Republicans and 8,825 (48.8%) were registered as Unaffiliated. There were seven voters registered as Libertarians or Greens.

In the 2012 presidential election, Democrat Barack Obama received 71.8% of the vote (9,350 cast), ahead of Republican Mitt Romney with 27.3% (3,552 votes), and other candidates with 0.9% (113 votes), among the 13,109 ballots cast by the township's 18,929 registered voters (94 ballots were spoiled), for a turnout of 69.3%. In the 2008 presidential election, Democrat Barack Obama received 69.4% of the vote (9,900 cast), ahead of Republican John McCain with 28.7% (4,100 votes) and other candidates with 0.4% (56 votes), among the 14,265 ballots cast by the township's 19,505 registered voters, for a turnout of 73.1%. In the 2004 presidential election, Democrat John Kerry received 60.0% of the vote (7,803 ballots cast), outpolling Republican George W. Bush with 38.8% (5,044 votes) and other candidates with 0.5% (100 votes), among the 13,004 ballots cast by the township's 18,444 registered voters, for a turnout percentage of 70.5.

In the 2013 gubernatorial election, Republican Chris Christie received 50.9% of the vote (3,880 cast), ahead of Democrat Barbara Buono with 47.7% (3,637 votes), and other candidates with 1.5% (112 votes), among the 7,811 ballots cast by the township's 18,939 registered voters (182 ballots were spoiled), for a turnout of 41.2%. In the 2009 gubernatorial election, Democrat Jon Corzine received 51.2% of the vote (4,425 ballots cast), ahead of Republican Chris Christie with 42.0% (3,625 votes), Independent Chris Daggett with 5.2% (447 votes) and other candidates with 0.8% (66 votes), among the 8,635 ballots cast by the township's 18,606 registered voters, yielding a 46.4% turnout.

Education
The Neptune Township Schools serve students in pre-kindergarten through twelfth grade. The district is one of 31 former Abbott districts statewide that were established pursuant to the decision by the New Jersey Supreme Court in Abbott v. Burke which are now referred to as "SDA Districts" based on the requirement for the state to cover all costs for school building and renovation projects in these districts under the supervision of the New Jersey Schools Development Authority.

As of the 2018–19 school year, the district, comprised of eight schools, had an enrollment of 4,063 students and 372.0 classroom teachers (on an FTE basis), for a student–teacher ratio of 10.9:1. Schools in the district (with 2018–19 enrollment data from the National Center for Education Statistics) are 
Early Childhood Center (228 students; in grade Pre-K), 
Gables School (269; Pre-K–5), 
Green Grove School (350; Pre-K–5), 
Midtown Community School (379; K–5), 
Shark River Hills School (264; Pre-K–5), 
Summerfield School (465; Pre-K–5), 
Neptune Middle School (721; 6–8) and 
Neptune High School (1,317; 9–12).

Historic district

Ocean Grove is a unincorporated community and census-designated place (CDP) that is part of Neptune Township, in Monmouth County, in the U.S. state of New Jersey. It had a population of 3,057 at the 2020 United States census. Founded in 1869 by a group of Methodist clergymen, led by William B. Osborn and Ellwood H. Stokes, this historic community is located on the Atlantic Ocean's Jersey Shore, between Asbury Park to the north and Bradley Beach to the south. It was here where the Ocean Grove Camp Meeting Association was founded as a summer camp meeting site on the New Jersey shore. Listed on the National Register of Historic Places, Ocean Grove is noted for its abundant examples of Victorian architecture and the Great Auditorium, acclaimed as "the state’s most wondrous wooden structure, soaring and sweeping, alive with the sound of music".

Infrastructure

Transportation

Roads and highways

Route 18, Route 33, Route 35, Route 66 and Route 71 are the main highways passing through the township.

The Garden State Parkway is west of the township, with the best access provided via exits 100 and 102. Interstate 195 is southwest of the township in neighboring Wall Township. The New Jersey Turnpike (Interstate 95) entrance for Exit 8 is about 25 miles west on Route 33 in East Windsor, Mercer County.

Public transportation
The township is served by NJ Transit trains at the Bradley Beach station on the North Jersey Coast Line to Newark Penn Station, Secaucus Junction, New York Penn Station and Hoboken Terminal.

NJ Transit bus service between the township and Philadelphia is available on the 317 route and local service is provided by the 830, 832 and 836 routes.

Healthcare

Jersey Shore University Medical Center (JSUMC) is a 691-bed non-profit, tertiary research and academic medical center located in Neptune Township. This major healthcare artery services the greater northern Jersey Shore region in Central Jersey. JSUMC is the shore region’s only university-level academic medical center and is a major partner of the Hackensack Meridian Healthcare network (it is the system's second largest hospital). JSUMC is also affiliated with the Robert Wood Johnson Medical School of Rutgers University, and Hackensack Meridian School of Medicine at Seton Hall University.  JSUMC is designated as a level II trauma center with a rooftop helipad handling medevac patients.

The medical complex also hosts the K. Hovnanian Children's Hospital, which treats infants, children, adolescents, and young adults up to the age of 21. JSUMC is a major teaching and tertiary care hospital that has a staff of 127 interns and residents, as it's a member of the Council of Teaching Hospitals and Health Systems.

Climate

Ecology
According to the A. W. Kuchler U.S. potential natural vegetation types, Neptune Township would have a dominant vegetation type of Appalachian Oak (104) with a dominant vegetation form of Eastern Hardwood Forest (25).

Notable people 

People who were born in, residents of, or otherwise closely associated with Neptune Township include:

 Lynn Ahrens (born 1948, class of 1966), writer and lyricist for the musical theatre, television and film
 Edward G. Amoroso, computer security professional, entrepreneur, author and educator
 Jack Armstrong (born 1965), Major League Baseball pitcher who played for the Cincinnati Reds, Cleveland Indians, Florida Marlins and Texas Rangers
 Nicole Atkins (born 1978), singer-songwriter on Columbia Records
 Pat Battle (born 1959), WNBC-TV's New Jersey Bureau Reporter, Saturday Today (NBC) in New York co-anchor, and occasional fill-in anchor
 Mary Porter Beegle (–1966), dancer, theater professional and college administrator
 Vinny Curry (born 1988), defensive end for the Philadelphia Eagles
 Michelle Davidson (born 1970), English Channel swimmer and U.S. Master Swimmer All-American
 Taquan Dean (born 1983), University of Louisville basketball player in 2006
 Danny DeVito (born 1944), actor
 Dedrick Dodge (born 1965), safety (American football position) for eight NFL seasons, from 1991 to 1998
 Darren Fenster (born 1978), manager in the Boston Red Sox minor league system
 Dan Gonzalez (born 1974), football quarterback who played two seasons with the Montreal Alouettes of the Canadian Football League
 Trent Hindman (born 1995), race car driver in the WeatherTech SportsCar Championship
 Eric Houghtaling (born 1954), politician representing the 11th Legislative District in the New Jersey General Assembly, who had served as mayor of Neptune Township in 2013
 Keith Kirkwood (born 1993), wide receiver for the New Orleans Saints of the National Football League
 Harry Larrison Jr. (1926–2005), politician who served on the Monmouth County Board of Chosen Freeholders for nearly 39 years, marking the longest tenure of a Freeholder in New Jersey history
 Ronald Naldi (born 1942), singer at the Metropolitan Opera
 Cory Nelms (born 1988), NFL player
 Jack Nicholson (born 1937), actor
 Joseph A. Palaia (1927–2016), politician who served in the New Jersey General Assembly from 1981 to 1989 and in the State Senate from 1989 to 2008, representing the 11th Legislative District
 Shep Pettibone (born 1959), record producer, remixer, songwriter and club DJ, who was most prolific in the 1980s
 Haydn Proctor (1903–1996), member of the New Jersey Senate
 Q Lazzarus (1960–2022), singer best known for her 1988 song "Goodbye Horses", which became a cult classic after being prominently featured in a scene from Jonathan Demme's 1991 film The Silence of the Lambs.
 Ed Radwanski (born 1963), professional soccer player
 Nate Ramsey (born 1941), safety and cornerback who played for the Philadelphia Eagles for most of his 11-year NFL career from 1963 through 1973
 Len Renery (born 1948, class of 1966), retired English-American professional soccer defender and coach
 Karl Roberson (born 1990), professional mixed martial artist and former kickboxer currently competing in the middleweight division of the Ultimate Fighting Championship
 Isaac Schlossbach (1891–1984), polar explorer, submariner and aviation pioneer
 Rusty Schweickart (born 1935), astronaut
 George A. Sheehan (1918–1993), cardiologist and running advocate
 Southside Johnny (born 1948), singer / songwriter
 Richard R. Stout (1912–1986), politician who served in the New Jersey Senate from 1952 to 1974
 Valerie Terrigno (born 1954), former mayor of West Hollywood, California
 Ronald R. Thomas (born 1949), writer, educator, and 13th president of the University of Puget Sound
 Greg Trooper (1956–2017), singer-songwriter.
 Bob Verga (born 1945), Dallas Chaparrals, Denver Rockets, New York Nets, Pittsburgh Condors, Portland Trail Blazers and Carolina Cougars basketball player, from 1964 to 1967 at Duke University and 1967–1974 professionally; owns the Duke men's basketball record for points per game (26.7) in a single season
 Joe Vetrano (1918–1995), placekicker who played in the NFL for the San Francisco 49ers
 Dennis Walters (born 1949), trick-shot golfer who won the Bob Jones Award in 2018 and was inducted into the World Golf Hall of Fame with the class of 2019
 Robert Lee Watt (born 1948), French horn player
 Clinton Wheeler (born 1959), former professional basketball player 
 Ajee' Wilson (born 1994), middle-distance runner 
 Tim Wright (born 1990), tight end who has played in the NFL for the New England Patriots

References

External links

Neptune Township official website
Neptune Township Schools

School Data for the Neptune Township Schools, National Center for Education Statistics
Neptune Township Public Library

 
1879 establishments in New Jersey
Jersey Shore communities in Monmouth County
Populated places established in 1879
Township form of New Jersey government
Townships in Monmouth County, New Jersey